Deh-e Hasanali or Deh-e Hasan Ali may refer to:

Deh-e Hasan Ali, Kerman
Deh-e Hasanali, Lorestan